In enzymology, a phosphoglucosamine mutase is an enzyme that catalyzes the chemical reaction

alpha-D-glucosamine 1-phosphate  D-glucosamine 6-phosphate

Hence, this enzyme has one substrate, alpha-D-glucosamine 1-phosphate, and one product, D-glucosamine 6-phosphate.

This enzyme belongs to the family of isomerases, specifically the phosphotransferases (a-D-phosphohexomutases), which transfer phosphate groups within a molecule.  The systematic name of this enzyme class is alpha-D-glucosamine 1,6-phosphomutase. This enzyme participates in aminosugars metabolism.

Crystal structures of two bacterial phosphoglucosamine mutases are known (PDB entries 3I3W and 3PDK), from Francisella tularensis and Bacillus anthracis.  Both share a similar dimeric quaternary structure, as well as conserved features of the active site, as found their enzyme superfamily, the a-D-phosphohexomutases.

References

 
 
 
 
 

EC 5.4.2
Enzymes of unknown structure